The large scrubwren (Sericornis nouhuysi) is a bird species. Placed in the family Pardalotidae in the Sibley-Ahlquist taxonomy, this has met with opposition and indeed is now known to be wrong; they rather belong to the independent family Acanthizidae.

It is found in New Guinea. Its natural habitat is subtropical or tropical moist montane forests.

Taxonomy
Sericornis nouhuysi includes the following subspecies:
 S. n. cantans - Mayr, 1930
 S. n. nouhuysi - Van Oort, 1909
 S. n. stresemanni - Mayr, 1930
 S. n. adelberti - Pratt, 1982
 S. n. oorti - Rothschild & Hartert, 1913
 S. n. monticola - Mayr & Rand, 1936

References

large scrubwren
Birds of New Guinea
large scrubwren
large scrubwren
Taxonomy articles created by Polbot